Semic Comics is one of the leading comic book publishers in France, also known as Semic S.A. Along with French comics, formerly the company published the official translations of products produced by DC Comics and Marvel Comics. Today, Semic publishes translations from others American publishers Avatar Press, Dark Horse Comics, Image Comics, and Top Cow Productions, among others.

History

Editions Lug 

In 1950, writer/editor Marcel Navarro and Auguste Vistel founded Editions Lug. At first, the company only reprinted old French and Italian comics. But soon, Navarro decided that his company needed some original characters. He enlisted a number of French and Italian studios to create new series. Although many of them invoked characters featured in American comics, they had enough differences to make them unique.

In 1969, Editions Lug began publishing licensed translations of Marvel Comics in a magazine called Fantask. That year also saw the creation of Wampus. But French censorship forced Editions Lug to cancel both of these magazines after six issues.

In the next two decades, Editions Lug continued to expand, thanks to its growing program of French editions of Marvel Comics, which began to include Conan the Barbarian. Many new magazines and series were added to their French line. A shared universe began to emerge, although not nearly as tightly integrated as the Marvel Universe.

In the mid-1980s, Auguste Vistel died. Eventually, Marcel Navarro chose to retire. The company was sold to the Semic Group, a Scandinavian comic book publisher.

Semic Group / Semic S.A. 
After Navarro's departure, the Semic Group continued to publish French editions of Marvel Comics, but discontinued the creation of original material. The half-dozen original Lug titles that remained became reprints-only.

During the late 1990s, the Semic Group transferred all of its French business to Tournon, their French distributors. Tournon soon broke up from the Semic Group and created their own company, Semic S.A.

In early 2004, after Semic had discontinued a line of comic books, a multinational group of writers and artists formed Hexagon Comics and reclaimed the rights to the characters they had created for Éditions Lug.

Series published by Semic

Franco-Belgian comics

Carabas

 See CARABAS

Tournon/Semic

 L'Affaire se Corse
 Brigade Temporelle
 C'est la Vie
 Caleb
 Cosmic Patrouille
 Fallait Pas Faire les Cons
 Hé, Nic ! Tu rêves ? (Hey, Nick! Are you dreaming?)
 Hip Flask
 La Grande Purge
 La Légende de la Jarre
 Légendes Celtes
 Légendes Lakotas
 Les Mysteres du Meurtre
 No Man's Land
 OverEarth
 Relais & Mago
 Ruse
 La Tapisserie de Soie
 La Voie du Samouraï

Comics

Semic Comics

 Alone in the Dark
 Aria
 BattleGods
 Buffy contre les Vampires
 City Legends (Nash & Zentak) – Formerly. Now published by Delcourt
 Concrete
 The Creech
 CrossGen Chronicles
 CrossGen Extra
 CrossGen Spécial
 CrossGen Universe
 Les CrossOvers
 The Dirty Pair
 The First
 Futurians
 GateCrasher
 Ghost
 Grendel
 Hellboy – Formerly. Now published by Delcourt
 Hellcop
 HellSpawn
 Just a Pilgrim
 Lady Pendragon
 Leave It to Chance
 Lenore
 Meridian
 Ministère de l'Espace
 More Than Mortal
 Motor Mayhem
 Mystic
 Photonik
 La Planète des Singes
 Powers
 The Red Star
 Rex Mundi
 Sam and Twitch
 Savage Dragon – Formerly. Now published by Delcourt
 Scion
 Shi
 Shock Rockets
 Sigil
 Smart Guns (Carmen McCallum & Travis) – Formerly. Now published by Delcourt
 Sojourn
 Spawn – Formerly. Now published by Delcourt
 "Simony"
 Stone
 Strangers
 Tellos
 The Tenth
 The 10th Muse
 Titan A.E.
 TransFormers
 Vampi
 Vampirella
 Witchblade – Formerly. Now published by Delcourt
 The Wicked
 YoungBlood

Manga and manhwa

Semic manga

 Les Mysteres d'Aloa
 Mangaka
 Shadows of Spawn
 Sentaï School

See also
 Panini Comics
 Semic Press

Notes

Editions Lug